Daniel Attinger is a mechanical engineer, researcher and an academic. He owns a US-based scientific consulting company.

Attinger has published over 80 research articles and has several patents registered in his name. His research focuses on forensics, bubble dynamics, multiscale transport phenomena in energy and forensic applications.

Attinger is the recipient of ASME-ICNMM Outstanding Researcher Award, NSF Early Career Award and is an Honorary Professor at Amity University in India. He is a Fellow of American Society of Mechanical Engineers. In 2013, Attinger was the Lead Editor of special issue for the ASME Journal of Nanotechnology in Engineering and Medicine.

Education 
In 1997, Attinger received his combined Bachelors and master's degree in Mechanical Engineering from Ecole Polytechnique Fédérale de Lausanne (EPFL) in Switzerland. He completed his Doctoral studies in Technical Sciences from Eidgenoessische Technische Hochschule (ETH Zurich) in 2001.

Career 
In 2002, Attinger moved from Switzerland to the US, working as Assistant Professor at Stony Brook University and from 2005 at Columbia University. In 2011, Attinger joined Iowa State University as a tenured Associate Professor of Mechanical Engineering. In 2014, he was named ‘Professor of the Year’ by the senior students of the Mechanical Engineering Department at Iowa State University. In 2015, the faculty members of the Mechanical Engineering Department elected Attinger to be their faculty representative on the ISU Mechanical Engineering Leadership Committee.

In 2017, during his tenure at Iowa State University, he faced administrative proceedings by the University regarding alleged violations of university rules on harassing behavior, which govern "criticism and actions taken as a result of disagreement." Attinger denied the allegations, saying he is "very articulate and honest in the feedback" he provides to students. In 2018, he filed a Federal lawsuit, claiming that the enforcement of vague university rules on faculty behavior was violating academic freedom and constitutional right to free speech. During the legal conflict, the University admitted that it was not accusing Attinger of discriminatory harassment. The conflict was resolved with a settlement where the parties admitted neither liability nor fault. According the settlement, Attinger was allowed to hire staff to assist him in his laboratory, and may pursue his research activities until mid-2021, when he will resign from Iowa State University.

He is the founder and CEO of a US-based scientific consulting company, Struo LLC.

Research 
Attinger has conducted research in multiphase microfluidics, forensics, drop dynamics, bubble dynamics, multiphase flow and multiscale transport phenomena. His research is relevant to the fields of biology, manufacturing, bloodstain pattern analysis, advanced thermal management and energy transport.

Heat transfer 
Attinger has taken up heat transfer as a research focus from the late 1990s. With his Ph.D. advisor Poulikakos, he studied the coupling between heat transfer, fluid dynamics and solidification during the impact of a molten drop on a silicone wafer. He developed an imaging technique to visualize the impact and deformation of the picoliter drop with a resolution of 5 microsecond, equivalent to 200,000 frames per second.

During the late 2010s, Attinger studied numerically the influence of surface wettability in boiling heat transfer. The stochastic-automata model developed with colleagues Clausse and Marcel was two orders of magnitude faster than current numerical methods at simulating pool boiling.

Bloodstain Pattern analysis 
One of Attinger's major research areas focuses on bloodstain pattern analysis (BPA), and has been funded by US Federal research agencies such as the National Institute of Justice and the US Army. In 2013, Attinger led a critical review on the relations between the disciplines of fluid dynamics and BPA. The review describes the fluid dynamics involved in BPA and contains an extensive table of research opportunities at the intersection of both disciplines. It also stresses on the need to integrate fluid dynamics with BPA as this integration may provide practical answers to specific questions related to BPA along while fluid dynamics may be presented with new flow problems.

With colleague De Brabanter and co-authors, Attinger proposed a method to reconstruct the area of origin of blood spatter patterns considering fluid dynamics and statistical uncertainties. Their model accounts for the curvature of the drop trajectories due to gravity and drag, and provides solutions with an uncertainty specific to the spatter pattern at hand With colleague De Brabanter and Ph.D. student Liu, Attinger explored the capabilities of artificial intelligence to assist in crime scene reconstruction. They developed a machine learning framework to classify bloodstain patterns generated under either gunshot or blunt impact. The classification accuracy, as high as 99% for given situations, was shown to decrease with the increasing distance between the target surface collecting the stains and the blood source.

Attinger and colleagues published two open source databases of bloodstain patterns, scanned in high resolution and freely available for research or teaching purposes.

Attinger used Newton's equation of motion along with other models for gravity and drag forces for the screening of five parameters including drop size, initial velocity and the launch angle. He then conducted fluid dynamics simulations based on the selected parameters and presented the results in the form of charts for the purpose of crime scene reconstruction. Attinger's research work in BPA has been discussed in several media outlets.

Fluid dynamics 
Advising Ph.D. student Xu, Attinger studied the interactions of ultrasound with bubbles. They observed traveling and standing waves on a bubble attached to a wall, including superharmonic waves which they explained as a parametric resonance. Applications of their research are in enhanced mixing of reagents and in the generation of drops and bubbles on-demand, with controlled timing and sizes, from nanoliter to picoliter.

Mentoring Ph.D. student Bhardwaj, Attinger investigated the formation of ring-like patterns during the evaporation of drops of complex fluids, and the formation of stains. The experimental and numerical findings indicated a radial flow pattern and the possible formation of multiple rings. Together with colleague Somasundaran, they also explained the possible causes of three types of deposit patterns, and proposed a phase diagram to predict the type of deposit.

With colleague Yarin and Ph.D. student Comiskey, Attinger proposed a theoretical model that predicts forward blood spatter patterns caused by bullet wound. The proposed model predicted the distributions of areas and locations of the individual blood stains. They studied two models for backward blood spatter due to a bullet, which showed how the shape of the bullet, blunt or sharp bullets, influences the formation of the drops. The research indicated that gunshot formed blood droplets due to Rayleigh–Taylor instability.

Nano-technology 
Attinger has also performed research in nano-technology.  Attinger engineered surfaces with heterogeneous wettability for fluid manipulation and boiling heat transfer enhancement. Together with Ph. D. student Betz and UCLA colleague Kim, he manufactured and characterized multi-scale patterned heterogeneous wettability surfaces. They also measured the enhancement of boiling performance in water and found that surfaces having combined superhydrophylic and superhydrophobic patterns led to exceptional pool boiling performance, combining high critical heat fluxes with very high heat transfer coefficients

With Orejon and coauthors, Attinger studied the condensation performance and the wetting behavior of multi-scale bio-inspired metallic surfaces with nanoscale features. They examined two surfaces resembling a rose petal and a lotus leaf and compared various properties including wetting behavior and condensation.

Awards and honors 
2005 - NSF early Career award
2012 - ASME-ICNMM Outstanding Researcher Award
2013 - Laureate of one out of seven Award from the Iowa State Presidential Initiative for Interdisciplinary Research

Selected articles 
A. R. Betz, J. Jenkins, C.-J. Kim, and D. Attinger, (2013). "Boiling heat transfer on superhydrophilic, superhydrophobic, and superbiphilic surfaces." International Journal of Heat and Mass Transfer 57(2): 733–741.
Betz, A., J. Xu, H. Qiu, and D. Attinger, Do surfaces with mixed hydrophilic and hydrophobic areas enhance pool boiling? Appl. Phys. Lett. 97, 141909 (2010); doi:10.1063/1.3485057.
Bhardwaj R., Fang X. and Attinger D., Pattern formation during the evaporation of a colloidal nanoliter drop: a numerical and experimental study, New Journal of Physics, vol. 11, p. 075020, 2009.
D. Attinger, C. Frankiewicz, A. R. Betz, T. M. Schutzius, R. Ganguly, A. Das, C.-J. Kim, and C. M. Megaridis, "Surface engineering for phase change heat transfer: A review," MRS Energy & Sustainability, vol. 1, 2014, pp. 1–40
D. Attinger, Z. Zhao, and D. Poulikakos, An Experimental Study of Molten Microdroplet Surface Deposition and Solidification: Transient Behavior and Wetting Angle Dynamics, ASME Journal of Heat Transfer Vol. 122 (3), pp. 544–556, 2000
D. Attinger, C. Moore, A. Donaldson, A. Jafari, and H. A. Stone, "Fluid dynamics topics in bloodstain pattern analysis: comparative review and research opportunities," (in eng), Forensic Sci Int, vol. 231, no. 1–3, pp. 375–96, 2013.
D. Attinger, P. M. Comiskey, A. L. Yarin, and K. De Brabanter, "Determining the region of origin of blood spatter patterns considering fluid dynamics and statistical uncertainties," Forensic Science International, vol. 298, pp. 323–331, 2019.
Y. Liu, D. Attinger, and K. De Brabanter, "Automatic Classification of Bloodstain Patterns Caused by Gunshot and Blunt Impact at Various Distances," Journal of Forensic Sciences, vol. 65, no. 3, pp. 729–743, 2020.

References 

American mechanical engineers
École Polytechnique Fédérale de Lausanne alumni
ETH Zurich alumni
Iowa State University faculty
Living people
Year of birth missing (living people)